Little Ndrova Island, also called  Ndawara Islet, is an island of Manus Province, Papua New Guinea, one of the Admiralty Islands.

References

Islands of Papua New Guinea